Sam Hawkins, Pirate Detective is a series of comedy children's books by Ian Billings. The first book, Sam Hawkins Pirate Detective and the Case of the Cutglass Cutlass was published by Macmillan Publishers in 2003. The sequel, Sam Hawkins Pirate Detective and the Pointy Head Lighthouse was published in 2004.

External links
 Macmillan Books official site
 Young Readers Birmingham entry
 The Book Review (India), noting review in Nov. 2004 issue

Series of children's books
Children's mystery novels
British children's novels
Novels about pirates